Géraldine Gogly(born 18 April 1946 in Paris) is a French singer.

Biography 
She started her career in 1966 with the label Polydor, releasing a 45' EP La rivière me disait ("The river has said to me"). Guy Lux then invited her to perform in his show "Le Palmarès des chansons".

She has performed in the debut of Enrico Macias at L'Olympia. She represented Switzerland in the Eurovision Song Contest 1967 in Vienna with the song "Quel cœur vas-tu briser?", finishing in last place with zero votes.

In 1968, she released another EP Les Chattes.

References

External links 
 Vidéo: Géraldine where she sings Quel cœur vas-tu briser?, a video of Télévision suisse romande

Eurovision Song Contest entrants of 1967
Eurovision Song Contest entrants for Switzerland
Living people
People from Bern
Singers from Paris
20th-century French women singers
20th-century Swiss women singers
1946 births
1947 births